The 1980 U/Tex Wranglers season was the sixth season of the franchise in the Philippine Basketball Association (PBA).

Transactions
After playing seven games with Crispa Walk Tall in the Open Conference, the Jeans Makers gave up and released two-time MVP William "Bogs" Adornado to U/Tex Wranglers.

Championship
U/Tex won the Open Conference title for their second PBA crown in three years by defeating Toyota Tamaraws, 99–98, in the deciding Game Five of the finals series best known for the "last 16 seconds". The Wranglers finish the four-team semifinals in a tie with Walk Tall Jeans and Toyota with similar four wins and two losses. U/Tex enters the championship round with a superior quotient, leaving the other two teams to dispute the second finals berth.

Scoring record
November 23:  William "Bogs" Adornado achieved a milestone by tying the record for most points by a local player shared with Danny Florencio while playing for Seven-up in 1977 by scoring 64 points in U/Tex' 126–111 win over San Miguel Beer.

Won-loss record vs Opponents

Roster

References

External links
 U-Tex team photo@interbasket.net

U-Tex Wranglers seasons
U-Tex